The 2014 Clio Cup China Series was a multi-event, one make motor racing championship held across China. The championship featured a mix of professional motor racing drivers and gentlemen drivers in the region, competing in a Clio Renault Sport 200 that conformed to the technical regulations for the championship. The 2014 season was the sixth Clio Cup China Series season. The season started on 22 March at Zhuhai International Circuit and concluded on 28 September at Shanghai International Circuit after ten races held at five meetings. In addition, the series went for the first time to the Sepang International Circuit, Malaysia. To add more excitement to the races, the series invited several celebrity drivers to take part including Hong Kong TV and movie star Alex Fong (方中信) and model Jacquelin Ch'ng (莊思敏).

South Africa's Naomi Schiff dominated the series, taking seven overall wins along with a further class win in the final round at Shanghai. Schiff won the championship by 135 points from Kenneth Ma, who did not finish better than third in any of the 10 races. Yang Xu finished a further 33 points behind in third place, having taken four successive second place finishes at the end of the season. The season's other winners were Eric Lo at the opening round in Zhuhai, and Byron Tong, who won at the second Zhuhai meeting. Lin Li Feng also won on a guest appearance at the Shanghai finale, but was ineligible to score drivers' championship points. With very few drivers competing in the whole season in Class B, Huang Yi was the winner of the championship.

Teams and drivers
A = Class A
B = Class B

Race calendar and results

References

External links
 

2014 in Chinese motorsport